A Cellarful of Noise is the title of Brian Epstein's 1964 autobiography. His assistant, Derek Taylor, was the ghostwriter of the book, which describes the early days of The Beatles, whom Epstein managed.

Epstein asked John Lennon what he thought the book should be called, and Lennon suggested "Queer Jew". Lennon later was quoted as saying that the book should have been titled "A Cellarful of Boys" in reference to Epstein's homosexuality.

In the 1978 film All You Need Is Cash, a book by Leggy Mountbatten—the manager of the Rutles and a parody of Epstein—is titled A Cellarful of Goys.

The phrase is also in the lyrics of Petula Clark's 1965 hit "I Know a Place".  Harry Shearer "dramatically reproduced" quotations from this book for the  music documentary Pop Chronicles.

The book was reprinted by Souvenir Press with an introduction by Craig Brown in 2021.

Notes

References

External links
Brianepstein.com page on Cellarful

1964 non-fiction books
Books about the Beatles
British autobiographies
Music autobiographies
English-language books
Souvenir Press books